The Disconto-Gesellschaft (full name: Direktion der Disconto-Gesellschaft), with headquarters in Berlin, was founded in 1851. It was, until its 1929 merger into Deutsche Bank, one of the largest German banking organizations.

History
It was founded in 1851 as a “credit partnership,” and in 1856 was changed into a limited liability, joint-stock company under the name of “Direktion der Disconto-Gesellschaft,” with a capital of 30,000,000 marks. Its founder was David Hansemann, later Prussian Minister of Finance. Since 1857 also his son Adolph von Hansemann worked in the bank of his father. Its purpose and earliest activities were in the fostering of current account business and the underwriting of German state and local loans and railway shares. In 1890, a branch was opened in London, from which time dated the institution's activities in overseas matters. In 1901, on the liquidation of the house of M. A. Rothschild & Sons of Frankfurt am Main, a branch was established in that city, connection being made with the Rothschild Syndicate, with which it has since been largely identified.

The interests formed with this group made the Disconto-Gesellschaft a prominent factor in the underwriting of many important national and railway loans, notably the state loans of Russia, Romania, China and Japan. In addition, in connection with other interests, it was instrumental in the financing of the Kamerun Railroad Company and the Great Venezuela Railway, both speculative enterprises, and the latter eventually of great financial annoyance.

As a national factor, the Disconto-Gesellschaft lent its greatest support to industry through the promotion and financing of enterprises for the development of Germany's natural resources: the mining of coal and metals, smelting, iron and steel, potash, shipbuilding, electrical development, railways, fire and life insurance, etc. It assisted in the underwriting of the 10,000,000 thaler (30,000,000 marks) 5 per cent loan for the Krupp Works, in 1874 — the first instance in Germany of the issue of fractional form bonds secured by blanket mortgage and providing for common representation of the holders of these bonds.

Beginning in 1881, Disconto-Gesellschaft established or participated in the establishment of 15 important banking institutions, having 87 branches, scattered throughout Europe, Asia, South Pacific, South America and Africa; and through communities of interest, it had banking connections in Hamburg, Leipzig, Bremen, Mannheim and Geestmunde, these latter having 51 branches and numerous other agencies throughout the German Empire. In 1914 it absorbed the A. Schaaffhausen'scher Bankverein, this latter still retaining its name and clientele. Close relations were established with other important financial and industrial institutions, its directorate having (1908) representation on the boards of 92 corporations. The capital for the same year was 170,000,000 marks; surplus, 57,592,611 marks; and annual dividend, 8 per cent. The total capital power of the Disconto-Gesellschaft group amounted to 564,747,329 marks, of which 437,786,200 marks represented capital and 126,981,129 marks surplus.

Notable associates

 David Hansemann (1851–1864)
 Karl Mathy (1855–1857)
 Adolph von Hansemann (1857–1903)
 Adolph Salomonsohn (1869–1888)
 Alexander Schoeller (1884–1911)
 Arthur Salomonsohn (1895–1929)
 Paul David Fischer, (1902–1920)
 Georg Solmssen (1911–1929)
 Hermann Fischer (1914–1919)

References
 This source in turn cites:
 Riesser, J., Die deutsche Grossbanken und ihre Konzentration (1909)
 Germany's Economic Forces (1913)
 Report on Co-operation in American Export Trade (Washington, D.C., 1916)

 
Banks established in 1851
Companies based in Berlin
Companies of Prussia
Defunct banks of Germany
Defunct companies of Germany
Deutsche Bank
Economic history of Germany
German companies established in 1851
1851 establishments in Prussia
1929 disestablishments in Germany
Banks disestablished in 1929